The Sun Theatre is an eight-screened cinema located in Melbourne, Australia, in the inner-west suburb of Yarraville.

History
The Sun Theatre originally opened in 1938 as a single-screen cinema seating 1,050 patrons. The Theatre was very popular in the area; it was noted for being the most luxurious cinema in the area and drew large crowds each week.  Ticket counters and a booking office were used to handle the crowds. The Sun's original candy location is today known as the Sun Bookshop. A unique feature to the cinema was the pram room, where babies in their prams were placed and given a number. If a baby started crying, its number was flashed on the screen to alert the parents.

The Sun's popularity began to dwindle during the 1950s and 60s, largely due to the introduction of television in Australia. In the late 1960s, the Sun was transformed into a Greek theatre to satisfy the growing Greek population of Yarraville. However, the new Greek Theatre was eventually shut down by the Health Department, due to unsanitary carpets.

The Sun remained in a derelict condition for 20 years, until it was purchased in 1995 by the current owners. However, years of neglect, graffiti and pilfering had reduced the once modern and sophisticated theatre into little more than four brick walls. The new owners transformed the Sun into one of Melbourne's most popular film societies between 1998 and 2003.

Facilities
Today, the Sun Theatre seats 700 patrons in eight boutique cinemas. Following its reopening in 1995, the Sun's large auditorium was divided into four cinemas, and another two were added to the rear. All of the new screens have the original architecture of the theatre. A popular feature of the current cinema is the original club seating which has all been fully refurbished with suede upholstery. A coffee table is shared between all seats in each group, which are noted for their ample leg room.

The cinemas of the Sun Theatre are all named after closed-down cinemas in Melbourne, in particular Yarraville and the Western suburbs.
 Grand, named after the last cinema to close operations in Footscray, is the Sun's largest cinema.
 Barkly, named after once famous Footscray cinema, is based on the dress circle of the original Sun.
 Trocadero, named after another long-closed cinema in Footscray, this cinema features parts of the original plaster of the Sun.
 Lyric, named after the second cinema in Yarraville, this cinema was originally intended to be the private screening room. It now features 33 chairs and 7 lounge chairs with coffee tables.
 Davis, named after the cinema's principal benefactor who was a projectionist at the Sun in the 1950s, this cinema features 100 seats and is decorated with memorabilia such as telegrams and the original Wurlitzer organ.
 La Scala, named after an Italian cinema in Footscray, this cinema features such luxuries as 52 leather couches and paintings by local artists.
 Roxy, the smallest cinema at the Sun, it is one of the cinemas three lounge cinemas and has only 20 available seats with art deco stylings on the walls
 St. Georges, named after the closed-down theatre in Yarraville across the train line, the St. Georges is a small cinema with two levels and couch seating. At the entrance is a painting by Wassily Kandinsky titled St. Georges.

Trivia
 It was the first Melbourne cinema to be constructed with a parabolic floor and pioneered the 'Continental' form of seating
 Was opened by Cr. Free, Mayor of Footscray
 Much of the Sun Theatre's unique interior suffered decay beyond repair during the 13-year period of its abandonment. The decorative ceiling had collapsed onto a tangled mess of wrought iron chairs, white ants had invaded all timber construction and floorboards, and there were gaping holes in the roof, along with graffiti, rot, and general destruction. The building had been stripped of its ornate doors, skirting and decorative features, walls were collapsing, cracks opening and the sub-floor furnace room was completely submerged. The building was an ashen shell having experienced several fires (believed to be deliberately lit).
 The Sun neon sign, which is positioned above the roof of the theatre and which can be seen from many points around Yarraville, has become a Yarraville icon.
 The Sun was visited in a surprise visit by Quentin Tarantino, Samuel L. Jackson and Kurt Russell in 2016, because the theatre was one of the select few Australian venues for the roadshow 70mm presentation of The Hateful 8, and Tarantino was impressed by the theatre's attempt to secure a proper 70mm projector just so they could show this film. The trio happened to be in Melbourne promoting the film and thought it would give the audience in attendance a memorable experience.
 The Sun was the filming location for some select interior scenes for the 2015 movie The Dressmaker, doubling for the Dungatar Theatre and exploiting its vintage seating for a story set in the 1950s.

References

External links

Cinemas in Melbourne
Art Deco architecture in Melbourne
Heritage-listed buildings in Melbourne
1938 establishments in Australia
Buildings and structures in the City of Maribyrnong
Theatres completed in 1938